Longgang District is one of the nine districts of Shenzhen, Guangdong. It is located in northeastern Shenzhen. The population of the district is 1,831,225.

Subdistricts

History
Longgang was established as a district on January 1, 1993. Archaeologists discovered antiques which dated back 7, 000 years ago in Xiantouling of Longgang District.

Economy
 Huawei is headquartered in Longgang District.
China South International Industrial Materials City (Shenzhen) Co., Ltd.

Education

Colleges and universities:
 Chinese University of Hong Kong, Shenzhen
 Shenzhen MSU-BIT University

K-12 schools operated by the Shenzhen Municipal government include:
Shenzhen No. 3 Senior High School (深圳市第三高级中学) Senior High School Division - Central District
 Shenzhen High School of Science (深圳科学高中) - Bantian Subdistrict
 Shenzhen Institute of Technology (深圳技师学院) - Wulian Community, Longcheng Subdistrict
 Shenzhen Sports School (深圳体育运动学校)
 Shenzhen Yuanping Special Education School (深圳元平特殊教育学校) - Buji Subdistrict

District schools:
 Longcheng High School

Tourist attractions
Longgang museum of Hakka culture
Beaches

Most of the beaches are in Dapeng New District.

Ju Diao Sha 桔钓沙
Dong Chong 东冲
Xi Chong 西冲

Rivers
Egongling River

Transportation

Shenzhen Metro
Longgang is currently served by four metro lines operated by Shenzhen Metro:

   - Buji  , Mumianwan, Dafen, Danzhutou, Liuyue, Tangkeng, Henggang, Yonghu, He'ao, Universiade , Ailian, Jixiang, Longcheng Square, Nanlian, Shuanglong
   - Wuhe , Bantian, Yangmei, Shangshuijing, Xiashuijing, Changlong, Buji  , Baigelong
   - Yabao, Nankeng, Guangyayuan, Wuhe , Bantian North, Bei'er Road, Huawei, Gangtou, Xuexiang, Gankeng, Liangmao Hill, Shanglilang, Mugu, Huanancheng, Hehua, Pinghu, Shuangyong Street
   - Buji  , Shiyaling, Liuyue North, Silian, Aobei, Universiade , Zhangbei, Nanyue, Baolong

See also

References

External links

 Official website of Longgang District government

 
Districts of Shenzhen